The United Denominations Originating from the Lighthouse Group of Churches (formerly Lighthouse Chapel International) is a Pentecostal Christian denomination founded in 1987 by Dag Heward-Mills and headquartered in Accra, Ghana.

Beliefs 
The church opposes prosperity theology. 

UD-OLDC is a member of the National Association of Charismatic and Christian Churches (NACCC) and the Pentecostal World Fellowship.

See also
List of the largest evangelical churches
List of the largest evangelical church auditoriums
Worship service (evangelicalism)

References

Further reading 

 
 
 

Christian denominations in Ghana
Accra
Churches in Ghana
1988 establishments in Ghana